William Dawes (1745–1799) was an American notable for his actions in the American Revolution.

William Dawes may also refer to:
Sir William Dawes, 3rd Baronet (1671–1724), Bishop of Chester and Archbishop of York
William Dawes (British Marines officer) (1762–1836), British Marines officer, pioneer in New South Wales and scientist
William Rutter Dawes (1799–1868), British astronomer
William Dawes (abolitionist), American abolitionist and fund raiser for Oberlin College in 1840
William Bower Dawes (1807–1869), South Australian politician

See also
William Dawe, author
William Dawes Miller, engineer